DownloadStudio is a shareware download manager developed and published by Conceiva. It can download files, entire websites, streaming audio and streaming video. DownloadStudio has been awarded by PC Magazine as the best download manager in its Utility Guide 2004.

Features
DownloadStudio is compatible with Internet Explorer, Opera, Mozilla Firefox, Flock, Google Chrome, Netscape, Mozilla, Maxthon, NetCaptor, and Avant browsers. Main features include being able to download complete web and FTP sites, download from Flash Video (FLV) from video server sites, download from common file hosting sites, and download digital media from SHOUTcast servers, and search engine results. Other features include:

Downloading a sequence of files using custom rules
Extracting compressed files and combining and extracted multipart zip files after download
Capturing streaming video clips and audio clips
And scheduling downloads

Additionally, DownloadStudio has a visual web and FTP site explorer to scour websites and support for FlashGot.

See also
Download acceleration
List of download managers
Comparison of download managers

References

Further reading
 The Best Internet Download Manager by PC Magazine Editor's Choice in 12th Annual Utility Guide, June 8, 2004 Review
 Streaming-Audio Capture Tools by PC Magazine, November 30, 2004 Review

External links
Official Website

Download managers